Jim Thiebaud is an American skateboarder.

Biography
Thiebaud grew up in the San Francisco Bay Area and during the 1980s was part of the San Francisco skate scene. Thiebaud not only participated in skateboarding during the early 1980s, but he also led, mentored, and encouraged a group of younger skateboarders including Rick Patterson, Mark Warren and Ben Fuller at Albany High School during 1982-1983 while attending high school, teaching and demonstrating tricks such as jumping onto walls, over stationary chairs as the board rolled under, and down staircases and stair railings in the Albany High courtyard. Groups would gather around to learn from Thiebaud and watch him demonstrate his growing craft.

Jim rode as an amateur for Powell-Peralta, then turned pro for Santa Monica Airlines before he and former Powell-Peralta teammate Tommy Guerrero co-founded Real Skateboards in 1991. He also later founded  Adeline Records in the late 1990s.

Thiebaud is the Vice President at Deluxe Distribution, the company that produces and distributes Real Skateboards, AntiHero Skateboards, Krooked Skateboards, Thunder Trucks, Venture Trucks, and Spitfire Wheels. Thiebaud is known as a very dedicated skateboarder who is very supportive of his team riders, skateboard shops, and anything that rings true to a simple, straightforward, "purist's" skateboarding ideal. Through "Actions REALized," Thiebaud was inspirational in the late 2000s movement of the skateboarding industry to look for and create worthwhile charities and causes within skateboarding that give back, support those in need, and perpetuate the idea of skateboarders taking care of their own.

Thiebaud currently lives in the San Francisco Bay Area.

Video appearances
1987: The Search For Animal Chin (Powell-Peralta)
1988: Public Domain (Powell-Peralta)
1989: Speed Freaks (Santa Cruz Speed Wheels)
1990: A Reason For Living (Santa Cruz Skateboards)
1993: The Real Video (Real Skateboards)
1996: Non-Fiction (Real Skateboards)
1999: Kicked Out Of Everywhere (Real Skateboards)

Filmography 
 1988 976-EVIL as "Rags"

References

External links 
 
 Jim Thiebaud profile on Skately

American skateboarders
Living people
Year of birth missing (living people)
Adeline Records
Sportspeople from the San Francisco Bay Area